Audric Estimé (born September 6, 2003) is an American football running back for the Notre Dame Fighting Irish.

Early years
Raised in Nyack, New York, Estime attended Saint Joseph Regional High School in Montvale, New Jersey. As a senior, he had 1,857 rushing yards and 22 touchdowns and was the NJ.com Football Player of the Year. He originally committed to Michigan State University to play college football before switching to the  University of Notre Dame.

College career
Estime spent his true freshman year at Notre Dame as a backup to Kyren Williams and had seven rushes for 60 yards. In 2022, he took over as the starting running back.

During the 2022 season, Estime served as the primary running back. He finished the regular season with 825 yards on 142 carries with 11 rushing touchdowns.

On December 30, 2022, Estime rushed for 95 yards on 14 carries in Notre Dame’s 45–38 victory in the TaxSlayer Gator Bowl vs South Carolina

Statistics

References

External links
Notre Dame Fighting Irish bio

Living people
Players of American football from New York (state)
American football running backs
Notre Dame Fighting Irish football players
People from Nyack, New York
Saint Joseph Regional High School alumni
Sportspeople from Rockland County, New York
2003 births